{{Infobox military person
| name          =Andre Jean Delorme
| image         =
| caption       =
| birth_date          =
| death_date          =
| placeofburial_label =
| placeofburial =
| birth_place  =Terrenoire, France
| death_place  =
| placeofburial_coordinates = 
| nickname      =
| allegiance    =France
| branch        =Infantry, then flying service
| serviceyears  =1914–1917
| rank          =Sous lieutenant
| unit          =Escadrille 56, Escadrille 38
| commands      =
| battles       =
| awards        =Légion d'honneur, Médaille militaire, Croix de Guerre'| relations     =
| laterwork     =
}}
Sous Lieutenant Andre Jean Delorme (17 June 1890 – 14 January 1917) was a World War I flying ace credited with five confirmed aerial victories. He was wounded four times in defense of his country before being killed in action.Over the Front: The Complete Record of the Fighter Aces and Units of the United States and French Air Services, 1914–1918, pp. 143-144

Biography

Andre Jean Delorme was born 7 June 1890 in Terrenoire, France. On 27 July 1914, he was recalled from pilot training for duty with his infantry regiment. He was wounded three times late that year, while being promoted through the ranks to Adjutant. He was returned to aviation training on 5 December 1914, receiving Military Pilot's Brevet No. 2026 on 14 June 1915.

Delorme was posted to Escadrille 56. He flew well enough to garner the Médaille Militaire on 21 February 1916. Despite flying a two-seat reconnaissance airplane, he scored his first two victories over German planes in May and June. On 10 June 1916, he became a Chevalier de la Legion d'honneur. Then, on 31 July 1916, he was wounded so severely he was evacuated to hospital.

After recuperating, Delorme returned to duty with Escadrille 38. Now equipped with a fighter, he scored victories on 26 November and 21 December of 1916. On 5 January 1917, he shot down his fifth German plane. Nine days later, he was killed in action.

Citations of awardsMédaille Militaire"Adjudant of Escadrille C56, pilot of remarkable audacity and sangfroid. Prepares his missions instantly and with great initiative and then executes them with remarkable energy. On 6 February 1916, he descended to 700 meters to bomb an important station where he caused an explosion and a fire. With his passenger wounded, he flew more than an hour in the clouds completely lost in enemy territory, but succeeded to land in our lines as his fuel gave out." Médaille Militaire citation
 Légion d'Honneur'''"Sous Lieutenant of Escadrille C56, elite officer who has distinguished himself by his brilliant conduct in the infantry, fighting combats at the start of the war during which he was wounded twice. As an airplane pilot, he has continued to demonstrate the highest qualities of bravery, devotion and audacity. On 28 May 1916, after having executed a bombardment very far to the rear of the lines, he was attacked by a German scout which he downed in flames, returning to the Escadrille with his plane riddled by bullets. Already has the Médaille Militaire and has been cited twice in army orders." Légion d'Honneur citation
Endnotes

 Reference 
 Franks, Norman; Bailey, Frank (1993). Over the Front: The Complete Record of the Fighter Aces and Units of the United States and French Air Services, 1914–1918'' London, UK: Grub Street Publishing. .

1890 births
1917 deaths
French World War I flying aces
French military personnel killed in World War I